Ispade Rajavum Idhaya Raniyum is a 2019 Indian Tamil language romance film by Ranjit Jeyakodi. The film stars Harish Kalyan and Shilpa Manjunath, while Ma Ka Pa Anand, Bala Saravanan, Suresh, and Ponvannan act in the supporting roles. Sam C. S. composed the film's soundtrack and score, while cinematography is handled by Kavin Raj and editing is done by Bavan Sreekumar. The film released on 15 March 2019 to mixed reviews and become a box office hit.

Plot
The story revolves around Gautham, an unemployed youth, and his love interest Thara, who belongs to the elite class and is engaged to family friend Rohith. Gautham's parents are divorced, and his mother is married to another person. Gautham hates his mother, and due to this, he had a broken childhood. Gautham is not able to control his anger. He is over-possessive and abusive. Thara, on the other hand, is a free-spirited girl. She is understanding and tolerates Gautham to a point. When his anger reaches to the peak, she calls off her relationship. What happens to them forms the crux of the story.

Cast

 Harish Kalyan as Gautham
 Shilpa Manjunath as Thara
 Ma Ka Pa Anand as Anand, Gautham's friend
 Bala Saravanan as Kumar, Gautham's friend
 Suresh as Thara's father
 Ponvannan as Gautham's father
 Lizzie Antony as Charulatha, Gautham's mother
 Mathew Varghese as Charulatha's second husband
 Ashwanth Thilak as Motorbike Driver
 Adithya Shivpink as Rohith
 Karthick Raj as Rohith's friend 
 Maari as Gautham's friend
 Put Chutney Rajmohan as Lawyer
 Sujatha Panju as Thara's mother
 Dhivya Duraisamy as Anand's pair
 Master Avanish as Young Gautham
 Ranjit Jeyakodi as Drug addict (Cameo appearance)

Production

The project was announced by director Ranjit Jeyakodi who previously directed the film Puriyatha Puthir. Harish Kalyan plays in the film and marks his second successive film as lead actor after Pyaar Prema Kaadhal (2018). The title of the film was announced with the film's first look. The phrase Ispade Raja in the film title implies the meaning of King of Spades while Idhaya Rani in the title of the film implies Queen of Hearts.

Music

The soundtrack album of Ispade Rajavum Idhaya Raniyum, featured music composed by Sam C. S. who also wrote lyrics for all the songs. The film marks Sam's second collaboration with director Ranjit, after Puriyatha Puthir (2017). In December 2018, it was revealed that actor Vijay Sethupathi had rendered one song for the film, along with actor Harish Kalyan, who also made his singing debut through this film. Later in January 2019, Anirudh Ravichander also recorded one song for the film. By mid-January Sam had wrapped up composition for the songs. A teaser of the song "Kannamma" sung by Anirudh was released on 9 January 2019, and the full song was released as the first single on 11 January 2019. The second single "Yei Kadavulae" was released on 23 January 2019. The full album was unveiled on 14 February 2019, coinciding with Valentine's Day, and the audio launch was held on Airtel Super Singer reality show, which was aired on Star Vijay. Singer Harish Kalyan does a reprised version of "Kannamma" which was released by Think Music on 25 June 2020.The songs of Ispade Rajavum Idhaya Raniyum eventually received rave reviews from the audience, especially youngsters. Jyothi Prabhakar of The Times of India, reviewed it as "The songs of Ispade Rajavum Idhaya Raniyum are hummable, danceable, and very likeable. No wonder, a couple of them are already tripping the charts. Sam CS has done a great job of getting the right mix of sounds and voices to keep all the songs, even the ones that intersect ‘sad scenes’ in the movie, from getting maudlin and noisy. As a rule, instead of varying the beats to fast and slow to keep pace with the emotions, Sam has kept the tempo going strong for all the songs, which works for the album as a whole."

Release 
The film was released on 1 March 2019.

Reception 
The film received mixed reviews from critics. Sreedhar Pillai of Firstpost gave 2 out of 5 stating "Ispade Rajavum Idhaya Raniyum is a watered-down version of Arjun Reddy, being too lengthy with a long drawn-out-second half." India Today gave 2 out of 5 stars and stated "The climax of Ispade Rajavum Idhaya Raniyum promotes a much-needed message about rejection. But, throughout the film, the director shows otherwise. In the end, there is a monologue by Harish Kalyan, which people might not lend an ear to." Sify gave 2 out of 5 and wrote "Ispade Rajavum Idhaya Raniyum will be liked by fans who enjoyed films like Kaatru Veliyidai and Neethane En Ponvasantham, where the two lovers are a confused pair." The Indian Express gave 1.5 out of 5 stars "Though Ispade Rajavum Idhaya Raniyum tries to explore how men behave in relationships when they come from a broken family, it justifies the violent behaviour of the protagonist." Srinivasan Ramanujam of The Hindu reviewed it as "A film that’s just as confused and complicated as the love story it portrays." Baradwaj Rangan of Film Companion gave 1.5 out of 5 and  wrote "The film takes a misconceived stab at self-awareness, with a conversation about stalking that’s not just badly written but not exactly relevant either, given this particular sequence of events. Imagine the irony. The one time Tamil cinema actually acknowledges this subject, it’s out of context."

In contrast, The Times of India gave 3 out of 5 to the film stating "The film has the required elements to attract youngsters though the screenplay becomes a little stretched in the latter half." Behindwoods gave the film 2.75 out of 5 stating "Mature handling of the an edgy script makes 'Ispade Rajavum Idhaya Raniyum' a worthy watch." Indiaglitz gave 2.75 out of 5 and stated "Go for IRIR for the ernest performances and a fairly engaging screenplay with a relevant message." The New Indian Express gave 2.5 out of 5 and stated "This film can also be seen as a take-down of the superficial romances we get, in which the sun shines bright and rainbows flash forever." Moviecrow gave 2.5 out of 5 and stated "Ranjit Jeyakodi's 'Ispade Rajavum Idhaya Raniyum' is a two hour long, self-obsessed rant of director's take on love and relationships. The standout from the film is Harish Kalyan's hard-hitting performance and the technical brilliance from the cinematographer, editor and music director."

References 

Indian romantic comedy films
Indian romantic thriller films
2010s romantic thriller films
Indian remakes of foreign films
Films scored by Sam C. S.
2019 romantic comedy films
2010s Tamil-language films
2019 films